is a Japanese writer. She has been nominated three times for the Akutagawa Prize, and won the prize in 2019. She has also won the Dazai Osamu Prize, the Mishima Yukio Prize, the Kawai Hayao Story Prize, and the Noma Literary New Face Prize.

Biography
Imamura was born in Hiroshima, Japan in 1980, and later moved to Osaka to attend university. 

She wrote her first story, a novella originally titled , while working a temporary job. Atarashii musume won the 26th Dazai Osamu Prize in 2010, and was published with her short story  in one volume under the new title , which then won the 24th Mishima Yukio Prize. 

In 2017, Imamura received the 5th Kawai Hayao Story Prize for her 2016 book . Ahiru was also nominated for the 155th Akutagawa Prize, but the prize went to Sayaka Murata. Hoshi no ko was also nominated for the 156th Akutagawa Prize, but the prize went to first-time writer Shinsuke Numata.

In 2019, Imamura received her third Akutagawa Prize nomination, for her novel . The book, a first-person account of a woman watching her neighbor, won the 161st Akutagawa Prize.

Imamura lives in Osaka with her husband and daughter.

Recognition
 2010: 26th Dazai Osamu Prize
 2011: 24th Mishima Yukio Prize
 2017: 5th Kawai Hayao Story Prize
 2017: 39th Noma Literary New Face Prize
 2019: 161st Akutagawa Prize (2019上)

Selected works
 , Chikuma Shobō, 2011, 
 , Shoshi Kankanbo, 2016, 
 , Asahi Shimbun Shuppan, 2017, 
 , Asahi Shimbun Shuppan, 2019,

References

1980 births
Living people
21st-century Japanese novelists
21st-century Japanese women writers
Japanese women novelists
Writers from Hiroshima
Akutagawa Prize winners
Yukio Mishima Prize winners